Yuliya Baraley (born 25 April 1990) is a Ukrainian sprinter who specializes in the 400 metres.

She won the gold medal at the 2007 World Youth Championships, finished fifth at the 2008 World Junior Championships, and won two gold medals at the 2009 European Junior Championships. She also competed in the 4 x 400 metres relay at the 2009 World Championships.

Her personal best time is 52.40 seconds, achieved in June 2008 in Yalta.

References

1990 births
Living people
Sportspeople from Dnipro
Ukrainian female sprinters